Justice Ryan may refer to:

Edward George Ryan (1810–1880), chief justice of the Wisconsin Supreme Court
Elmer W. Ryan (1902–1980), associate justice of the Connecticut Supreme Court
Howard C. Ryan (1916–2008), chief justice of the Illinois Supreme Court
James L. Ryan (born 1932), associate justice of the Michigan Supreme Court
Michael D. Ryan (1945–2012), associate justice of the Arizona Supreme Court
Sean Ryan (judge) (born 1948), judge of the Irish High Court

See also
Judge Ryan (disambiguation)